Peytonsville (formerly known as Snatch and Snatchett) is an unincorporated community in Williamson County, Tennessee. The Nathaniel Smithson House, which is listed on the National Register of Historic Places, is located in Peytonsville.

Notable people
Tom Little, editorial cartoonist

References

Unincorporated communities in Williamson County, Tennessee
Unincorporated communities in Tennessee